Boris Grigorýewiç Kramarenko (born 1 November 1955 in Ashgabat, Turkmen SSR) is a former Soviet wrestler who competed in the 1980 Summer Olympics.

References

External links
 

1955 births
Living people
Turkmenistan male sport wrestlers
Olympic wrestlers of the Soviet Union
Wrestlers at the 1980 Summer Olympics
Soviet male sport wrestlers
Olympic bronze medalists for the Soviet Union
Olympic medalists in wrestling
Sportspeople from Ashgabat
Honoured Masters of Sport of the USSR
Medalists at the 1980 Summer Olympics